Die Spinne (German for "The Spider") was a post-World War II organization thought to have helped certain Nazi war criminals escape justice. Its existence is still debated today. It is believed by some historians to be a different name, or a branch, of ODESSA, an organization established during the collapse of Nazi Germany, similar to Kameradenwerk, and der Bruderschaft, devoted to helping German war criminals flee Europe. It was led in part by Otto Skorzeny, Hitler's commando chief, as well as Nazi intelligence officer Reinhard Gehlen. Die Spinne helped as many as 600 former SS men escape from Germany to Francoist Spain, Juan Peron's Argentina, Paraguay, Chile, Bolivia, the Middle East, and other countries.

Die Spinne was established by Skorzeny using the aliases Robert Steinbacher and Otto Steinbauer, and supported by either Nazi funds or, according to some sources, Austrian Intelligence. Later, Skorzeny, Gehlen, and their network of collaborators had gained significant influence in parts of Europe and Latin America. Skorzeny travelled between Francoist Spain and Argentina, where he acted as an adviser to President Juan Perón and bodyguard of Eva Perón, while fostering an ambition for the "Fourth Reich" centred in Latin America.

According to Infield, the idea for the Spinne network began in 1944 as Hitler's chief intelligence officer Reinhard Gehlen foresaw a possible defeat of Nazi Germany due to Nazi military failures in Russia. T.H. Tetens, expert on German geopolitics and member of the US War Crimes Commission in 1946–47, referred to a group overlapping with die Spinne as the Führungsring ("a kind of political Mafia, with headquarters in Madrid... serving various purposes.") The Madrid office built up what was referred to as a sort of Fascist International, per Tetens. According to Tetens the German leadership also included Dr Hans Globke, who had written the official commentary on the Nuremberg Laws. Globke held the important position of Director of the German Chancellery from 1953 to 1963, serving as adviser to Konrad Adenauer.

The "Fascist International"
From 1945 to 1950, Die Spinnes leader Skorzeny facilitated the escape of Nazi war criminals from war-criminal prisons to Memmingen, Bavaria, through Austria and Switzerland into Italy. Certain US military authorities allegedly knew of the escape, but took no action. The Central European headquarters of Die Spinne as of 1948 was in Gmunden, Upper Austria.

A coordinating office for international Die Spinne operations was established in Madrid by Skorzeny under the control of Francisco Franco, whose victory in the Spanish Civil War had been aided by economic and military support from Hitler and Mussolini. When a Die Spinne Nazi delegation visited Madrid in 1959, Franco stated, "Please regard Spain as your second Fatherland." Skorzeny used Die Spinnes resources to allow notorious Nazi concentration camp doctor Joseph Mengele to escape to Argentina in 1949.

Skorzeny requested assistance from German industrialist tycoon Alfried Krupp, whose company had controlled 138 private concentration camps in Nazi Germany; the assistance was granted in 1951. Skorzeny became Krupp's representative in industrial business ventures in Argentina, a country which harboured a strong pro-Nazi political element throughout World War II and afterwards, regardless of a nominal declaration of loyalty to the Allies as World War II ended. With the help of Die Spinne leaders in Spain, by the early 1980s Die Spinne had become influential in Argentina, Chile and Paraguay, including ties involving Paraguayan dictator Alfredo Stroessner.

War Crimes investigator Simon Wiesenthal claimed Joseph Mengele had stayed at the notorious Colonia Dignidad Nazi colony in Chile in 1979, and ultimately found harbour in Paraguay until his death. As of the early 1980s, Die Spinnes Mengele was reported by Infield to have been advising Stroessner's ethnic German Paraguayan police on how to reduce native Paraguayan Indians in the Chaco Region to slave labour. A wealthy, powerful post–World War II underground Nazi political contingent held sway in Argentina as of the late 1960s, which included many ethnic German Nazi immigrants and their descendants.

In popular culture
The "Spinne" network in Spain is the focus of the 1966 Nick Carter spy novel Web of Spies.

"THRUSH" ("WASP") from the TV-series (as well as the unnamed antagonist in the movie) called The Man from U.N.C.L.E., is built upon Die Spinne.

Ian Fleming (who allegedly was the MI6 handler in real life "Operation James Bond" to extract Bormann out of Berlin) had in his fictional James Bond series Bormann's network in mind for "Octopussy" (Die Spinne) and S.P.E.C.T.R.E. (Die Spinne / O.D.E.S.S.A.).

In Michael A. Kahn's legal mystery or thriller Bearing Witness an age discrimination case ultimately leads back to a decades-old post-war conspiracy involving American Nazis linked to Die Spinne.

See also
ODESSA
Ratlines
Gehlen Organization

References

Bibliography
 Infield, Glenn. The Secrets of the SS. Stein and Day, New York, 1981; .
 Tetens, T.H. The New Germany and the Old Nazis. Random House/Marzani+Munsel, 1961; LCN .
 Wechsberg, Joseph. The Murderers Among Us. McGraw Hill, New York, 1967; LCN .

Nazi SS
Secret societies in Germany
Conspiracy theories in Germany
Organizations established in the 1940s
Aftermath of World War II in Germany
Nazis in South America
German veterans' organisations